Graham Smith is an English former professional footballer and former technical director of Sacramento Republic FC.

Career

Playing career
Smith, who played as a goalkeeper, began his professional career in 1968 with Notts County. He also played in the Football League for Colchester United, West Bromwich Albion, and Cambridge United, making a total of 200 league appearances for all four clubs. Smith was a member of Colchester United's famous FA Cup giant killing team, beating Leeds United 3–2 on 13 February 1971. Smith was later inducted to the Colchester United Hall of Fame in 2009.

Management career

After playing professional football, Graham went on to be the product director at both Adidas and Le Coq Sportif. He then moved to Chelsea Football Club to take a position on the board of directors before moving into football agency, starting up First Wave Sports UK and then First Wave Sports USA.

Ventura County Fusion PDL (USL League Two) 2006–2009 (Head Coach)
Sacramento Republic (USL Championship) 2014–2017 (Director of Football)

Personal life
Graham is living both in California and Mexico. He has two sons both living in the USA. Graham's oldest son, Adam Smith, was also a professional footballer, beginning his career as a schoolboy at Premiership Club Everton  Adam later went on to spend a year with Walsall F.C. after completing a college degree in business and sports coaching at Manchester Metropolitan University. He then went on to play with teams in Asia, Scotland and the US as a full-time professional and semi-professional player.

Graham is now happily semi-retired and his successful agency business (First Wave Sports) is now being run and managed by the former professional Major League Soccer player Stefani Miglioranzi.

Managerial statistics
 Ventura County Fusion. PDL National Championship winner 2009 (Head Coach)
 Sacramento Republic FC. USL National Championship winner 2014 (Technical Director)
 Sacramento Republic FC. USL Western Conference 1st-place finish (Director of Football)

Honours

Playing honours
Colchester United
Watney Cup: 1971

References

1947 births
Living people
English footballers
Notts County F.C. players
Colchester United F.C. players
West Bromwich Albion F.C. players
Cambridge United F.C. players
Wigan Athletic F.C. players
English Football League players
English football managers
Association football goalkeepers